Orurillo District is one of nine districts of the province Melgar in Peru.

Ethnic groups 
The people in the district are mainly indigenous citizens of Quechua descent. Quechua is the language which the majority of the population (87.82%) learnt to speak in childhood, 11.98 	% of the residents started speaking using the Spanish language (2007 Peru Census).

See also 
 Hatun Mayu
 Janq'u Q'awa
 Janq'uquta

References